KRC Motors or more simply KRC is an Italian manufacturer of electric scooters, based in Marcianise.

Company
KRC (keep road clean) Motors was born in Marcianise, Caserta (Campania) from the younger generation of the Rampini family. 

The headquarters are in the industrial area of the city and here electric scooters are developed, assembled and tested in the company surface that measures over 15,000 meters.

Technology

The technology present on all vehicles includes air or liquid cooling, lithium batteries, brushless engines, produced by the company, with the possibility of rapid recharging (30 minutes) with a normal electrical outlet.

The scooters are equipped with various technologies concerning brakes, chassis, etc. The most important part however, in addition to the engine, is the battery pack which is composed of 24 solid 72Vdc cells.
The control units are dedicated to monitoring the battery pack, 

consequently to the balancing the performance and duration of the individual lithium cells.

See also
 Electric motor
 Electric vehicle

References

Scooter manufacturers
Italian brands
Companies based in Campania
Motorcycle manufacturers of Italy